Gibraltarian English can refer to:
 Gibraltarian English, the accent of English spoken in the Gibraltar.
 Llanito (or Yanito), an Andalusian Spanish based vernacular spoken in the Gibraltar.